Chorizo de Macao, sometimes called Chinese Chorizo or Longaniza Macau, is a Filipino dry pork sausage. The ingredients of Chorizo de Macao is identical to other Filipino sweet longganisas (longganisa hamonado), except for its dry texture and its use of star anise, aniseed, or anise liqueur (anisado), which gives it its distinctive aroma and its name. It is commonly used in Chinese Filipino dishes like pancit Canton and siopao. It is sometimes confused with and used in place of Chinese sausage.

See also
Chorizo de Bilbao
Chorizo de Cebu
 List of sausages

References

Philippine sausages